Raizo or Raizō is a Japanese-origin masculine given name.  It is uncommon as a surname. People with the name or its variants include:

 Raizo Ichikawa, Japanese film and kabuki actor
 Raizo Matsuno (松野頼三 Matsuno Raizō; 1917 - 2006), Japanese politician
 Raizō Tanaka, admiral in the Imperial Japanese Navy during World War II
 Morita Raizō (守田 来蔵, Morita Raizō? もりた らいぞう, 1830 - 1889), Japanese photographer

Japanese masculine given names